Buu-Yao District is one of 17 sub-district of Nimba County, Liberia. As of 2008, the population was 40,007.

References

 

Districts of Liberia
Nimba County